The 2016–17 season is the club's second season in the Scottish Championship. St Mirren will also compete in the Challenge Cup, the League Cup and the Scottish Cup.

Month by month review

May
3 May – The club announced the departure of 13 players from last seasons playing squad. The players leaving at the end of their contracts are Sean Kelly, 
Jim Goodwin, Alan Gow, Stuart Carswell, Cameron Howieson, Scott Agnew, Barry Cuddihy, Jaison McGrath and Alex Cooper. Saints icon Steven Thompson has retired, Keith Watson has signed a pre-contract agreement with St Johnstone, and loanees David Clarkson and Lawrence Shankland return to their parent clubs.

9 May – Midfielder, Jordan Stewart, signed a one-year professional contract with the club.

10 May – Kyle Hutton signed a two-year contract with the club, after leaving Queen of the South.

13 May – forward Calum Gallagher signed a one-year contract extension, keeping him at the club until the summer of 2017.

19 May – after being released by Motherwell, forward David Clarkson returned to Saints after signing a one-year deal.

20 May – Andy Webster, who was club captain for most of last season, signed a one-year contract extension with the club.

June
2 June – 30-year-old defender Ben Gordon signed for Saints after leaving relegated Livingston. Gordon was a former youth player with Saints, and signed a one-year deal.

21 June – defender Gary MacKenzie signed a one-year deal with Saints after being released by Doncaster Rovers.

23 June – goalkeeper Scott Gallacher signed a one-year deal with the club, after leaving Alloa Athletic.

28 June – former Saints striker, John Sutton, returned to the club after signing a two-year deal.

July
17 July – midfielder Tom Walsh joined the club on a six-month loan deal from Rangers.

19 July – Aberdeen striker Lawrence Shankland returned to the club on a season-long loan deal, after having a success spell with the club last season.

22 July – Gordon Scott became the new chairman of the club, after a takeover was completed today. Scott and the St Mirren Independent Supporters Association (SMISA) bought out former chairman Stewart Gilmour.

26 July – striker Ryan Hardie joined on loan from Rangers until January 2017.

August
4 August – Lewis Morgan signed a one-year contract extension, tying him to the club until 2018.

September
16 September – Defender Ben Gordon, joined Alloa Athletic on loan until January 2017, a week after making his debut for Saints.

18 September – after a winless start to the season, manager Alex Rae and his assistant manager David Farrell, were sacked. The head of the Saints academy, Allan McManus, takes over as interim boss.

October
4 October – Alloa Athletic manager, Jack Ross, was appointed new Saints manager.

7 October – James Fowler was appointed new Saints Assistant manager.

November
14 November – Saints were drawn at home to Welsh side, The New Saints, in the Semi-finals of the Scottish Challenge Cup.

29 November – midfielder Kyle Hutton moved to Scottish League One side Airdrieonians on an emergency loan deal until January 2017.

December
9 December – teenage forward Kyle Magennis signed a two-year contract extension after recently breaking into the first team.

January
3 January – Saints signed Aberdeen midfielder Craig Storie on loan until the end of the season, while Rangers loanees Tom Walsh and Ryan Hardie left the club.

11 January – striker Lawrence Shankland left the club when his season long loan deal was cut short, and immediately joined Greenock Morton on loan for the remainder of the season.

12 January – Saints signed striker Rory Loy on loan from Dundee, and Norwegian midfielder Pål Fjelde from Bryne FK. Both players join until the end of the season.

Also on this day, it was confirmed that defender Jason Naismith had signed a pre-contract agreement with Scottish Premiership side Ross County. He will join them in the summer once his contract with Saints expires.

13 January – forward Calum Gallagher left the club to join fellow Scottish Championship side Dumbarton. Gallagher made 54 appearances for the club, scoring 8 goals in all competition.

16 January – Saints signed midfielder Josh Todd from Dumbarton until the end of the season.

18 January – defender Jason Naismith left the club, to join Scottish Premiership side Ross County. A pre-contract deal had recently been confirmed, but a deal was agreed so that Naismith could job County immediately. Naismith leaves the club after five years, scoring 4 goals in 106 appearances.

19 January – 21 year-old goalkeeper Billy O'Brien signed for the club on loan from Manchester City until the end of the season.

20 January – Cypriot defender Stelios Demetriou signed for the club until the end of the season from Doxa Katokopias.

22 January – Saints were drawn away to Scottish League One side East Fife in the Scottish Cup 5th Round.

25 January – goalkeeper Scott Gallacher left the club by mutual consent, after having his one-year contract cut short. He made 16 appearances in his time at the club.

26 January – 21-year-old Aberdeen forward Cammy Smith joined Saints on loan until the end of the season.

27 January – Young starlet Kyle McAllister left the club, moving to EFL Championship side Derby County on a three-and-a-half year deal for an undisclosed fee. On the same day, former Saints midfielder Stephen McGinn returned to the club on an 18-month deal after recently leaving Wycombe Wanderers.

31 January – Saints signed defenders Adam Eckersley and Harry Davis on the winter transfer deadline day. Eckersley signed from FC Edmonton until the end of the season, and Davis signed on loan until the end of the season from Crewe Alexandra

On the same day Jordan Stewart and Kalvin Orsi left the club on loan deals, to Annan Athletic and Queen's Park respectively.

February
19 February – Saints reached the final of the Challenge Cup, after beating Welsh side The New Saints 4–1 in the Semi-finals. The final with Dundee United will take place in March 2017. This is the third time the club have reached the final of the competition.

Squad list

Results & fixtures

Pre season / Friendlies

Scottish Championship

Scottish Challenge Cup

Scottish League Cup

Scottish Cup

Player statistics

Captains

Appearances and goals
Last updated 7 May 2017

|-
|colspan="14"|Players who left the club during the season:

|}

Disciplinary record
Includes all competitive matches.
Last updated 7 May 2017

Team statistics

League table

Division summary

Management statistics
Last updated on 7 May 2017

Transfers

Players in

Players out

See also
List of St Mirren F.C. seasons

Notes

References

St Mirren F.C. seasons
St Mirren